Figueres can refer to:

 Figueres,  a town in Catalonia, Spain, the birthplace of the artist Salvador Dalí.
 Figueres onion, an onion cultivar named after the town
 FE Figueres, a Spanish football (soccer) club, currently playing in the Primera Catalana.
 UE Figueres, a Spanish football (soccer) club, currently playing in the Tercera Catalana.
 José Figueres Ferrer (1906-1990) was a military, politician and three times president of Costa Rica (1948-1949, 1953–1958, and 1970–1974).
 His son, José María Figueres Olsen (1954-), who was also president of Costa Rica (1994-1998).
 His daughter, Christiana Figueres, who is a diplomat.

ca:Figueres